The Herodian dynasty was a royal dynasty of Idumaean (Edomite) descent, ruling the Herodian Kingdom of Judea and later the Herodian Tetrarchy as a vassal state of the Roman Empire. The Herodian dynasty began with Herod the Great, who assumed the throne of Judea, with Roman support, bringing down the century-old Hasmonean Kingdom. His kingdom lasted until his death in 4 BCE, when it was divided among his sons as a tetrarchy, which lasted for about 10 years. Most of those tetrarchies, including Judea proper, were incorporated into Judaea Province from 6 CE, though limited Herodian de facto kingship continued until Agrippa I's death in 44 CE and nominal title of kingship continued until 92 CE, when the last Herodian monarch, Agrippa II, died and Rome assumed full power over his de jure domain.

History

Origin 

During the time of the Hasmonean ruler John Hyrcanus (134–104 BCE), Judea conquered Edom (Idumea) and forced the Edomites to convert to Judaism.

The Edomites were gradually integrated into the Judean nation, and some of them reached high-ranking positions. In the days of Alexander Jannaeus, the Edomite Antipas was appointed governor of Edom. His son Antipater, father of Herod the Great, was the chief adviser to Hasmonean Hyrcanus II and managed to establish a good relationship with the Roman Republic, who at that time (63 BCE) extended their influence over the region, following conquest of Syria and intervention in a civil war in Judea.

There are differing genealogies for the dynasty, depending on the source. According to Sextus Julius Africanus, Antipater's father was named Herod, and Epiphanius of Salamis writes that this Herod's father was named Antipas. It is Josephus who states that Antipas fathered Antipater, without further delineating his ancestry. This model is usually accepted by scholars.

Julius Caesar appointed Antipater to be procurator of Judea in 47 BCE and he appointed his sons Phasael and Herod to be governors of Jerusalem and Galilee respectively. Antipater was murdered in 43 BCE; however, his sons managed to hold the reins of power and were elevated to the rank of tetrarchs in 41 BCE by Mark Antony.

Rise to power 

In 40 BCE, the Parthians invaded the eastern Roman provinces and managed to drive the Romans out of many areas. In|Judea, the Hasmonean dynasty was restored under king Antigonus II Mattathias as a pro-Parthian monarch. Herod the Great, the son of Antipater the Idumaean and Cypros (possibly of Nabataean descent), managed to escape to Rome. After convincing the Roman Senate of his sincere intentions in favor of Romans he eventually was announced as king of the Jews by the Roman Senate.

Despite his announcement as king of the whole of Judea, Herod did not fully conquer it until 37 BCE. He subsequently ruled the Herodian kingdom as a vassal king for 34 years, crushing the opposition while also initiating huge building projects, including the harbor at Caesarea Maritima, the plaza surrounded by retaining walls at the Temple Mount, the Masada and the Herodium, among other fortresses and public works. Herod ruled Judea until 4 BCE; at his death, his kingdom was divided among his three sons as a tetrarchy.

Tetrarchies
Herod Archelaus, son of Herod and Malthace the Samaritan, was given the title of ethnarch and ruled over the main part of the kingdom: Judea proper, Idumea, and Samaria. He ruled for ten years until 6 CE, when he was "banished to Vienna in Gaul, where according to Cassius Dio, "Hist. Roma," lv. 27—he lived for the remainder of his days." See also Census of Quirinius.

Philip, sometimes erroneously called Herod Philip II, was the son of Herod and his fifth wife Cleopatra of Jerusalem. He was given the title of tetrarch with jurisdiction over the northeast part of his father's kingdom: Iturea, Trachonitis, Batanaea, Gaulanitis, Auranitis, and Paneas. He ruled until his death in 34 CE.

Herod Antipas, another son of Herod and Malthace, was made a tetrarch of Galilee and Perea; he ruled there until he was exiled to Spain by emperor Caligula in 39 CE, according to Josephus. Herod Antipas is the person referenced in the Christian New Testament Gospels, playing a role in the death of John the Baptist and the trial of Jesus. The Gospel of Luke states that Jesus was first brought before Pontius Pilate for trial, since Pilate was the governor of Roman Judea, which encompassed Jerusalem where Jesus was arrested. Pilate initially handed him over to Antipas, in whose territory Jesus had been most active, but Antipas sent him back to Pilate's court.

Last rulers
Herod Agrippa was the grandson of Herod. Thanks to his friendship with Caligula, the emperor appointed him ruler with the title of king over the territories of Philip in 37 CE, which were after Philip's death in 34 CE shortly part of the Roman province of Syria, and in 40 CE he was given the territories of Herod Antipas. In 41 CE, Emperor Claudius added to his territory the parts of Judea province that previously belonged to Herod Archelaus. Thus Agrippa I practically re-united his grandfather's kingdom under his rule. Agrippa died in 44 CE.

Agrippa's son Herod Agrippa II was appointed a tetrarch of Chalcis and later king of the territories previously ruled by Philip. He actively participated in the quelling of the Great Revolt of Judea on the Roman side. Agrippa II was the last of the Herodians; with his death in c. 92 or 100 CE the dynasty was extinct, and the kingdom became fully incorporated into the Roman province of Judaea.

In addition, Herod of Chalcis ruled as king of Chalcis, and his son, Aristobulus of Chalcis, was tetrarch of Chalcis and king of Armenia Minor.

List of Herodian rulers (47 BCE – 100 CE)
 Antipater the Idumaean (Procurator of Judaea) 47–44 BCE
 Herod the Great 
 Governor of Galilee 47–44 BCE
 Tetrarch of Galilee 44–40 BCE
 Elected king of all Judaea by the Roman Senate 40 BCE, reigned 37–4 BCE
 Phasael (Governor of Jerusalem) 47–40 BCE
 Pheroras (Governor of Perea) 20–5 BCE
 Herod Archelaus (Ethnarch of Judaea) 4 BCE – 6 CE
 Herod Antipas (Tetrarch of Galilee) 4 BCE – 39 CE
 Philip the Tetrarch (Tetrarch of Batanaea) 4 BCE – 34 CE
 Salome I (Tetrach of Jabneh) 4 BCE – 10 CE
 Tigranes V of Armenia (King of Armenia) 6–12 CE
 Herod Agrippa
 King of Batanaea 37–41 CE
 King of Galilee 40–41 CE
 King of all Judaea 41–44 CE, previously Judaea (Roman province), given to him by Claudius, and reinstated as a province after his death.
 Herod of Chalcis (King of Chalcis) 41–48 CE
 Herod Agrippa II 
 Tetrarch of Chalcis 48–53 CE 
 King of Batanaea 53–100 CE
 Aristobulus of Chalcis
 King of Armenia Minor 55–72 CE
 Tetrarch of Chalcis 57–92 CE
 Tigranes VI of Armenia (King of Armenia) 58–61 CE
 Gaius Julius Alexander (King of Cetis) 58–72 CE

Herodian dynasty in later culture

Literature

Novels
 Hordos u-Miryam (1935), a Hebrew novel by Aaron Orinowsky
 Mariamne (1967), a Swedish novel by Pär Lagerkvist
 Claudius the God (1934), an English novel by Robert Graves, features Herod Agrippa I as an important character

Plays
Herod appears in some cycles of the Mystery Plays, played as an over the top villain.  Such portrayals were still in folk memory in William Shakespeare's time, for Hamlet instructs the players not to "out-Herod Herod" (Act 3, Scene 2).
 Marianna (1565), an Italian drama by Lodovico Dolce
 Mariam, the Faire Queene of Jewry (1613) an English drama by Elizabeth Tanfield Cary
 Herod and Antipater, with the Death of Faire Mariam (1622), an English drama by Gervase Markham and William Sampson
 Mariamne (1636), a French drama by François Tristan l'Hermite
 La mort des enfants d’Hérode; ou, Suite de Mariamne (1639), a French drama by Gathier de Costes de la Calprenède
 Herod and Mariamne (1673), an English drama by Samuel Pordage
 La Mariamne (1696), an Italian opera by Giovanni Maria Ruggeri (mus.) and Lorenzo Burlini (libr.)
 Mariamne (1723), a French drama by Elijah Fenton
Herod features in two 18th century French plays on Mariamne, by Nadal and Voltaire.
 Herodes und Mariamne (1850), a German drama by Christian Friedrich Hebbel
 Myriam ha-Hashmonayith (1891), a Yiddish drama by Moses Seiffert
 Tsar Irod I tsaritsa Mariamna (1893), a Russian drama by Dmitri Alexandrov
 Herod and Mariamne (1938), an English drama by Clemence Dane

Poetry
 Herod and Mariamne (1888), an English poem by Amelie Rives
 Mariamne (1911), an English poem by Thomas Sturge Moore

Movies
 The King of Kings (1927) by Cecil B. DeMille
 Salome (1953) by William Dieterie
 King of Kings (1961) by Nicholas Ray
 The Greatest Story Ever Told (1965) by George Stevens, David Lean, Jean Nugelesco
 Herod the Great (1959) (Italy) by Victor Tourjansky

Figurative arts

Painting
 Mariamne Leaving the Judgment Seat of Herod (1887), a painting by John William Waterhouse

Performing arts

Music
 Herod’s Lament for Mariamne (1815), an English song by Isaac Nathan (mus.) and George Byron (libr.)
 Herodes und Mariamne (1922), incidental music by Karol Rathaus
 Lied der Mariamne (ohne Worte) (1927), incidental music by Mikhail Gnesin

Ballet
 La Marianna (1785), an Italian ballet by Giuseppe Banti (chor.)

Opera
 Marianne (1796), opera in French with music by Nicolas Dalayrac and a libretto of Benoît-Joseph Marsollier
 Hérodiade (1881), opera in French by Jules Massenet after Gustave Flaubert's play Hérodias (1877)
 Salome (1905), opera in German by Richard Strauss after Oscar Wilde's play's Salome

Family tree of the Herodian dynasty

See also 
Hasmonean dynasty
History of ancient Israel and Judah#Roman occupation
Herod's Temple
Herodian coinage
Herodian kingdom
Kings of Israel and Judah
Kings of Judah
List of High Priests of Israel
Promagistrate
Siege of Jerusalem (37 BC)

References

Bibliography
 Julia Wilker, Für Rom und Jerusalem. Die herodianische Dynastie im 1. Jahrhundert n.Chr. (Berlin, Verlag Antike, 2007) (Studien zur Alten Geschichte, 5).

Further reading
 Burrell, Barbara, and Ehud Netzer. “Herod the Builder.” Journal of Roman Archaeology 12 (1999): 705–715.
 Kokkinos, Nikos. The Herodian Dynasty: Origins, Role In Society and Eclipse. Sheffield: Sheffield Academic Press, 1998.
 Kropp, Andreas J M. “Kings in Cuirass – Some Overlooked Full-Length Portraits of Herodian and Nabataean Dynasts.” Levant 45, no. 1 (2013): 45–56.
 Richardson, Peter. Herod: King of the Jews and Friend of the Romans. Columbia: University of South Carolina Press, 1996.
 Rocca, Samuel. Herod’s Judaea: a Mediterranean state in the classical world. Tübingen: Mohr Siebeck, 2008.

External links

Jewish Encyclopedia: Herodians

 
Jews and Judaism in the Roman Republic and the Roman Empire
Classical Syria
Classical Palestine
Judea (Roman province)
1st-century BCE Judaism
1st-century Judaism